Paradesisa is a genus of longhorn beetles of the subfamily Lamiinae, containing the following species:

 Paradesisa borneensis Breuning, 1938
 Paradesisa mindanaonis Breuning, 1980

References

Pteropliini